The French-American School of Chicago (EFAC) is a French international school in Lincoln Park, Chicago, Illinois. Elementary and junior high school classes are held at Abraham Lincoln Elementary School while senior high school classes are held at Lincoln Park High School. The school first opened in 1981 and high school classes began in 1995.

Students in the high school division may live in any place in the city of Chicago, but only persons living in the Abraham Lincoln Elementary boundary may attend the elementary and middle school program.

See also
American schools in France:
 American School of Paris - An American international school in France
 American School of Grenoble

References

External links
 French-American School of Chicago
  French-American School of Chicago

International schools in Illinois
French international schools in the United States
French-American culture in Illinois
1981 establishments in Illinois
Educational institutions established in 1981